Quetteville is a commune in the Calvados department in the Normandy region in northwestern France.

The name of the city is derived from the Latin Ketelvilla, meaning Ketil's villa. Ketil was probably the name of a Viking settler.

The surname DeQuetteville  is derived from the city's name.

Population

See also
Communes of the Calvados department

References

Calvados communes articles needing translation from French Wikipedia
Communes of Calvados (department)